Benedikt Kuripečič or Benedikt Kuripešić (1491–1531) was a 16th-century Slovene diplomat who recorded epic songs about Miloš Obilić.

Kuripečič was born in Gornji Grad, then part of the Habsburg Empire, now Slovenia. He entered the diplomatic service of the Habsburg monarchy and served in Moscow and Istanbul. His notable works include records of his journey through Serbia in 1530 (Itinerarium Wegrayß. Kü. May. potschafft gen Constantinopel zů dem Türckischen Kayser Soleyman. Anno xxx) (Itinerarium of Departure by His Royal Majesty’s Emperor to Constantinople to the Turkish Sultan Suleiman. Year 30) when he traveled to Istanbul as a translator in the service of King Ferdinand. His records describe emigration of people from Serbia to Bosnia in 1530. In his work he recorded some legends about the Battle of Kosovo and mentions epic songs about Miloš Obilić in regions far from Kosovo, such as Bosnia and Croatia. According to his records, the Ottoman Empire lost the battle. He traveled through Kosovo and mentioned songs about the heroic deeds of Miloš Obilić and his unjustified slander.

See also
 List of Austrian ambassadors to Turkey

References

Further reading 
 

1491 births
1531 deaths
Diplomats of the Habsburg monarchy
Slovenian travel writers
16th-century diplomats
16th-century travel writers